The 2015 FC Shakhter Karagandy season is the 24th successive season that the club will play in the Kazakhstan Premier League, the highest tier of association football in Kazakhstan. Shakhter Karagandy will also be participating in the Kazakhstan Cup.

Season events
Manager Vladimir Cheburin resigned on 6 May, with Yevgeni Sveshnikov being appointed as caretaker manager. On 5 June Sveshnikov was released from his managerial duties, with Ihor Zakhariak being appointed in his place.

Squad

Reserve team

Transfers

Winter

In:

Out:

Summer

In:

Out:

Competitions

Kazakhstan Premier League

First round

Results summary

Results by round

Results

League table

Relegation round

Results summary

Results by round

Results

League table

Kazakhstan Cup

Squad statistics

Appearances and goals

|-
|colspan="14"|Players away from Shakhter Karagandy on loan:
|-
|colspan="14"|Players who appeared for Shakhter Karagandy that left during the season:

|}

Goal scorers

Disciplinary record

References

FC Shakhter Karagandy seasons
Shakhter Karagandy